Eric B. Knox (Ph.D., University of Michigan, 1993) is a Research Scientist at the Indiana University Biology Department 
and the Director of the Indiana University Herbarium 
where he optimizes laboratory protocols and studies the flora of Indiana.

References 

Year of birth missing (living people)
Living people
University of Michigan alumni
Indiana University faculty
Botanists active in Africa
21st-century American botanists